Nhlanhla Tyirha is a South African professional boxer, who has held the WBO Global light flyweight title since 2021.

Professional boxing career
Tyirha made his professional debut against Sabelo Nkosi on 17 June 2018. He won the fight on points. Tyirha amassed an undefeated 3–0 record during the next four months, before being booked to challenge Bongani Silila for the South African light flyweight title on 7 December 2018. He captured his first professional title by a third-round knockout.

Following his victory against Silila, Tyirha challenged the reigning WBO Africa light flyweight champion Nkosinathi Joyi on 28 April 2019. He suffered the first loss of his professional career, as Joyi won the fight by unanimous decision, with scores of 116–112, 116–113 and 118–112.

Tyirha faced Joey Canoy for the vacant WBA Inter-continental light flyweight title on 21 May 2021. He won the fight by unanimous decision. Tyirha next faced Jaysever Abcede on 1 October 2021 for another vacant belt, the WBO Global light flyweight title. Despite being knocked down in the opening round, Tyirha rallied back to win the majority of the remaining rounds and capture the title by unanimous decision, with scores of 117–110, 117–110 and 116–111.

Tyirha faced Esneth Domingo (16–1) on 28 May 2022, at the Premier Elicc in East London. He won the fight by unanimous decision, with scores of 97–93, 96–94 and 96–94. Later that same year, on 30 October, Tyirha faced Orlie Silvestre for the vacant IBF Inter-Continental light flyweight title. He captured the vacant belt by unanimous decision, with two scorecards of 119–109 and one scorecard of 120–108.

Professional boxing record

References

2000 births
Living people
Sportspeople from East London, Eastern Cape
South African male boxers
Light-flyweight boxers